Monty Wilkinson may refer to:

 Monty Wilkinson (lawyer), American lawyer
 Monty Wilkinson (footballer) (1908–1979), English professional footballer